The Agnes Irwin School is a non-sectarian college preparatory day school for girls from pre-kindergarten through grade 12. It was founded in 1869 by Agnes Irwin in Philadelphia. Irwin, a great-great-granddaughter of Benjamin Franklin, later became the first dean of Radcliffe College. In 1933, the campus moved to Wynnewood, Pennsylvania, and then to its present location in Rosemont in 1961.

Location and campus
It is in Radnor Township. The campus sits on eighteen-acres.

Extracurricular
Fourteen varsity sports including basketball, crew, cross country, field hockey, golf, lacrosse, soccer, softball, squash, swimming and diving, tennis, track, and volleyball. Performing arts include dance, choral and instrumental groups and dramatic and musical productions. Visual arts include studio art, ceramics, photography and media arts. There is a Community Service program and a number of clubs.

Accreditation and associations
Middle States Association of Colleges and Schools (1934), Pennsylvania Association of Independent Schools, National Coalition of Girls’ Schools, Cum Laude Society (1991), National Association of Independent Schools.

Notable alumnae

 Tory Burch (1984), fashion designer
 Eleanor Stuart Childs, novelist and short story writer
 Dorothy Harrison Eustis (1904), established The Seeing Eye, an organization dedicated to training guide dogs to help the blind
 Caroline Furness Jayne, ethnologist
Lindy Li, political analyst
 Mary Patterson McPherson (1953), executive officer of the American Philosophical Society, former vice president of the Mellon Foundation, former president of Bryn Mawr College
 Vanessa Noel, shoe designer
 Agnes Repplier (did not graduate), Essayist
 Kara Ross (1984), jewelry designer
 Molly Swanton, mystery writer

References

External links
Official site

Educational institutions established in 1869
Private high schools in Pennsylvania
Girls' schools in Pennsylvania
Radnor Township, Delaware County, Pennsylvania
Schools in Delaware County, Pennsylvania
Private middle schools in Pennsylvania
Private elementary schools in Pennsylvania
1869 establishments in Pennsylvania